The 2023 UEFA Super Cup will be the 48th edition of the UEFA Super Cup, an annual football match organised by UEFA and contested by the reigning champions of the top two European club competitions, the UEFA Champions League and the UEFA Europa League. The match will feature the winners of the 2022–23 UEFA Champions League and the 2022–23 UEFA Europa League. It will be played at the Karaiskakis Stadium in Piraeus, Greece, on 16 August 2023.

The match was originally scheduled to be played at the Ak Bars Arena in Kazan, Russia. However, due to the 2022 Russian invasion of Ukraine, the match was moved on 25 January 2023 to Piraeus.

Real Madrid are the defending champions.

Venue

Original host selection
The Ak Bars Arena in Kazan, Russia, was originally selected as the final host by the UEFA Executive Committee during their meeting in Amsterdam, Netherlands, on 2 March 2020. The Albanian Football Association also had bid for the match to be hosted in Tirana, but withdrew the candidature prior to the vote.

The match would have been the first UEFA Super Cup to be held in Russia, and the second UEFA club competition final to be held in the city after the 2009 UEFA Women's Cup Final. The stadium was previously a venue for the 2017 FIFA Confederations Cup, where it hosted three group stage matches and a semi-final, and the 2018 FIFA World Cup, where it hosted four group stage matches, a round of 16 fixture and a quarter-final.

Relocation to Piraeus
After the 2022 Russian invasion of Ukraine, it was uncertain whether the match would be played in Kazan. Russia was suspended from UEFA and FIFA competitions in February 2022, and the 2022 UEFA Champions League Final, scheduled for Saint Petersburg, was also relocated to Paris. Tatarian officials had called for UEFA to leave the competition in Kazan.

On 25 January 2023, the UEFA Executive Committee stripped Kazan of hosting rights, and relocated the match to the Karaiskakis Stadium in Piraeus, Greece.

Match

Details
The Champions League winners will be designated as the "home" team for administrative purposes.

See also
2023 UEFA Champions League Final
2023 UEFA Europa League Final
2023 UEFA Europa Conference League Final
2023 UEFA Women's Champions League Final

Notes

References

External links

2023
Super Cup
Scheduled association football competitions
August 2023 sports events in Europe
2023–24 in Greek football
Sports competitions in Piraeus
International club association football competitions hosted by Greece
Sports events affected by the 2022 Russian invasion of Ukraine